Makana Local Municipality is the local municipality which governs the town of Makhanda/Grahamstown and surrounding areas in the Eastern Cape province of South Africa. It forms part of the Sarah Baartman District Municipality. The municipality is named after a Xhosa prophet and leader, Makana.

Main places
The 2011 census divided the municipality into the following main places:

Politics 

The municipal council consists of twenty-seven members elected by mixed-member proportional representation. Fourteen councillors are elected by first-past-the-post voting in fourteen wards, while the remaining thirteen are chosen from party lists so that the total number of party representatives is proportional to the number of votes received. In the election of 1 November 2021 the African National Congress (ANC) won a majority of fourteen seats on the council.
The following table shows the results of the election.

Friendship Co-operation Agreement
In February 2011, Makana Municipality entered into a "Friendship Co-operation Agreement" with Raseborg Municipality in Finland.  The project, which is to last three years, seeks to facilitate information sharing in the fields of economic development, arts & culture, women development, youth development, and education.

Provincial Administration
On 28 August 2014 the Municipality was placed under administration in response to financial and infrastructural crises. The interim administration order, made in terms of section 139(1)(b) of the South African Constitution, is expected to be reviewed after three months. Shortly after the administration order was announced, news of a damning forensic report — the Kabuso report — naming several municipal officials purported to be involved in financial impropriety was made public.

Dissolution 
In 2014 the city council was placed under administration by the courts for three months. This was due to its financial instability and inability to provide basic services. This intervention was not successful and on 14 January 2020, the Eastern Cape High Court dissolved the municipal council. The municipality will subsequently head to fresh elections. The Makhanda High Court made legal history by ordering the Makana Municipal Council to be dissolved. The court ruled that its ongoing failure to provide services to the residents of Makhanda was unconstitutional.

Residents of Makhanda have widely welcomed a high court ruling that the Makana Municipal Council must be dissolved over its unconstitutional failure to provide services. It was the first such order by a court in South Africa. “This judgment sparks hope. We couldn’t live like this any more. We are very happy,” said Ayanda Kota, the founder of the Unemployed People's Movement, the organisation that brought the application.

References

External links
 Makana Municipality
 Makana-Raseborg - blog documenting the progress of the friendship co-operation agreement.

Local municipalities of the Sarah Baartman District Municipality